Ivana Gavrić (born ) is a British pianist. She was named Newcomer of the Year at the BBC Music Magazine Awards 2011.

Career
The daughter of pianist Zrinka Gavrić, Ivana Gavrić was born in Sarajevo and commenced her studies at the age of six at the Central Junior Music School of Sarajevo. Following her move to the UK in 1992, she attended The Latymer School and the Guildhall School of Music Junior Department, where she was awarded the Keyboard Prize, and studied with James Gibb. She went on to read music at St Catharine's College, Cambridge where she was an Instrumental Award Holder. She completed her Masters in Advanced Performance with Distinction at the Royal College of Music, where she studied with Niel Immelman. She complemented her studies in masterclasses with Dmitri Bashkirov, Ferenc Rados, Menahem Pressler, Pascal Devoyon and Alexander Satz.

Gavrić made her Wigmore Hall solo début in July 2010.

Gavrić released her debut disc In the mists, featuring works by Janáček, Schubert, Liszt and Rachmaninov, on Champs Hill Records in August 2010. The CD was named Instrumental Choice of the Month by BBC Music Magazine, was nominated as “outstanding” in International Record Review, and received four-star reviews in The Guardian, Independent on Sunday and The Telegraph.

Gavrić released her second album From the street, featuring works by Janáček, Ravel and Prokofiev on Champs Hill Records in October 2011. The disc was award the "Outstanding" accolade by International Record Review and received 5 stars in BBC Music Magazine.

Gavrić performed on the soundtracks of Anthony Minghella's Breaking and Entering and the BBC Two series The Line of Beauty, where she plays the role of pianist Nina Glaserova.

At the April 2011 BBC Music Magazine Awards, Gavrić was named Newcomer of the Year.

Discography
 Chopin, Edition Classics, 2017
  Grieg: Piano Works, Champs Hill Records, 2013
 From the street, Champs Hill Records, 2011
 In the mists, Champs Hill Records, 2010
 Breaking and Entering: Original Soundtrack, V2 Records, 2006

References

External links
 Ivana Gavrić official website
 One to watch, Gramophone Magazine.

Musicians from Sarajevo
British classical pianists
British women pianists
Alumni of St Catharine's College, Cambridge
Alumni of the Royal College of Music
Living people
Year of birth missing (living people)
21st-century classical pianists
21st-century women pianists